The 37th District of the Iowa Senate is located in eastern Iowa, and is currently composed of Cedar and Johnson Counties.

Current elected officials
Zach Wahls is the senator currently representing the 37th District.

The area of the 37th District contains two Iowa House of Representatives districts:
The 73rd District (represented by Bobby Kaufmann)
The 74th District (represented by David Jacoby)

The district is also located in Iowa's 2nd congressional district, which is represented by Mariannette Miller-Meeks.

Past senators
The district has previously been represented by:

Charles Bruner, 1983–1990
Ralph Rosenberg, 1991–1992
Mary Kramer, 1993–2002
Douglas Shull, 2003–2006
Staci Appel, 2007–2010
Kent Sorenson, 2011–2012
Robert Dvorsky, 2013–2018
Zach Wahls, 2019–present

See also
Iowa General Assembly
Iowa Senate

References

37